The East River Road–North Hickory Canal Bridge is a bridge located on East River Road over the North Hickory Canal, connecting Grosse Ile, Michigan with Hickory Island to the south.  It was listed on the National Register of Historic Places in 2000.

History

In the early part of the 20th century, the East River Road bridge over the North Hickory Canal was a timber structure.  In 1944, the Wayne County Road Commission formulated plans to widen and straighten the southern section of road, moving it to the west.  The original bridge was replaced with this structure, completed in 1945.

Description
The bridge is continuous concrete slab bridge. Wayne County used this type of bridge in the years during and after World War II, presumably because of the difficulty of obtaining steel during these years. The bridge has solid concrete parapet railings embedded with a pebble aggregate and trimmed with a horizontal line. The ends of the railings curve to follow the perpendicular wing walls. The piles of the bridge are octagonal, part of the road commission's continuous experimentation with bridge design.

See also

References

External links

East River Road Bridge from HistoricBridges.org: Multiple photographs of the bridge

Road bridges on the National Register of Historic Places in Michigan
Bridges completed in 1945
Bridges in Wayne County, Michigan
National Register of Historic Places in Wayne County, Michigan
Concrete bridges in the United States